The northern lapwing (Vanellus vanellus), also known as the peewit or pewit, tuit or tew-it, green plover, or (in Ireland and Britain) pyewipe or just lapwing, is a bird in the lapwing subfamily. It is common through temperate Eurosiberia.

Behaviour

It is highly migratory over most of its extensive range, wintering further south as far as North Africa, northern India, Nepal, Bhutan and parts of China. It migrates mainly by day, often in large flocks. Lowland breeders in westernmost areas of Europe are resident. It occasionally is a vagrant to North America, especially after storms, as in the Canadian sightings after storms in December 1927 and in January 1966.

It is a wader that breeds on cultivated land and other short vegetation habitats. 3–4 eggs are laid in a ground scrape. The nest and young are defended noisily and aggressively against all intruders, up to and including horses and cattle.

In winter, it forms huge flocks on open land, particularly arable land and mud-flats.

Taxonomy
The northern lapwing was formally described by the Swedish naturalist Carl Linnaeus in 1758 in the tenth edition of his Systema Naturae under the binomial name Tringa vanellus. The species is now placed with the other lapwings in the genus Vanellus that was introduced by the French zoologist Mathurin Jacques Brisson in 1760. The scientific name Vanellus is Medieval Latin for the northern lapwing and derives from vannus, a winnowing fan. The species is monotypic: no subspecies are recognised.

The name lapwing has been variously attributed to the "lapping" sound its wings make in flight, from the irregular progress in flight due to its large wings (the Oxford English Dictionary derives this from an Old English word meaning "to totter"), or from its habit of drawing potential predators away from its nest by trailing a wing as if broken. The names peewit, pewit, tuit or tew-it are onomatopoeic and refer to the bird's characteristic call.

Description

It has rounded wings and a crest. It is also the shortest-legged of the lapwings. It is mainly black and white, but the back is tinted green. The male has a long crest and a black crown, throat and breast contrasting with an otherwise white face. Females and young birds have shorter crests, and have less strongly marked heads, but plumages are otherwise quite similar.

This is a vocal bird in the breeding season, with constant calling as the crazed tumbling display flight is performed by the male. The typical contact call is a loud, shrill "pee-wit" from which they get their other name of peewit. Displaying males usually make a wheezy "pee-wit, wit wit, eeze wit" during their display flight; these birds also make squeaking or mewing sounds.

It feeds primarily on insects and other small invertebrates. This species often feeds in mixed flocks with golden plovers and black-headed gulls, the latter often robbing the two plovers, but providing a degree of protection against predators.

Like the golden plovers, this species prefers to feed at night when there is moonlight.

The northern lapwing is one of the species to which the Agreement on the Conservation of African-Eurasian Migratory Waterbirds (AEWA) applies.

Population decline
National surveys of England and Wales have shown a population decline between 1987 and 1998, and since 2009 the northern lapwing has had red list conservation status in the United Kingdom. The numbers of this species have been adversely affected by intensive agricultural techniques. In the lowlands this includes the loss of rough grassland, conversion to arable or improved grassland, loss of mixed farms, and switch from spring- to autumn-sown crops. In the uplands, the losses may have been due to increases in grazing density. Natural England gives grant aid to help restore lapwing habitat within its Environmental Stewardship Scheme. The organisation suggests an option within this scheme called 'Fallow plots for ground-nesting birds'. Uncropped plots at least  in size provide nesting habitat and are located in suitable arable fields, which provide additional foraging habitat. Locating the plots within  of extensively grazed grassland will provide additional foraging habitat. The plots are cultivated in the spring to produce a rough fallow, which is retained without the input of fertiliser or pesticides. In addition to agricultural intensification and land-use change, predation of nests and chicks contributes to wader declines, including of lapwing. By radio-tagging lapwing chicks, and using automatic radio tracking systems, the timing of chick predation can be revealed, which provides additional insights in to the importance of different predators. Lapwing chicks are predated both in the day and at night, with mammalian predators having the greatest impact.

In Armenia, the population decline and loss of breeding habitats was also documented; the threats are thought to be intensification of land use and hunting, but further investigations for threat clarification are required. In the Middle East, the northern lapwing is threatened by overhunting as it is shot in large quantities along its winter migration routes. Several photos surfacing from the region show tens of Northern lapwings, alongside other migratory birds including the threatened European turtle dove and European golden-plover killed in unsustainable and unnecessary numbers.

Cultural significance

Harvesting eggs
"Plover's eggs" were an expensive delicacy in Victorian Europe, mentioned in Evelyn Waugh's Brideshead Revisited, about aristocratic British society in 1920–40. In the Netherlands, there is a cultural-historical competition to find the first peewit egg of the year (het eerste kievietsei). It is especially popular in the province Friesland, but there are also regional competitions. Gathering peewit eggs is prohibited by the European Union, but Friesland was granted an exception for cultural-historical reasons. The Frisian exception was removed in 2005 by a court, which determined that the Frisian executive councillors had not properly followed procedure. As of 2006 looking for peewit eggs is permitted between 1 March and 9 April, though harvesting the eggs is now forbidden. In 2008 the first egg was found on 3 March, in Eemnes, Utrecht, and the first egg of 2009 was found on 8 March in Krabbendijke. Over the last century, the first peewit egg has been found earlier and earlier in the year. This is ascribed to both increased use of fertiliser and climate change, causing the growth of grass needed for egg laying to occur earlier.

In Ireland

The northern lapwing was declared the Republic of Ireland's national bird by a committee of the Irish Wildlife Conservancy in 1990. In the Irish language it is called pilibín, "little Philip", supposedly a reference to Philip II of Spain (King of Ireland 1554–58), who often wore a feather in his cap.

Mythology
The bird referred to in English translations of Ovid's Metamorphoses, book 6, as lapwing is probably the northern lapwing. Tereus is turned into an epops (6.674); Ovid presumably had the hoopoe in mind, whose crest indicates his royal status and whose long, sharp beak is a symbol of his violent nature.

References

External links

LIFE Waders For Real - Lapwing recovery project, Avon Valley, Hampshire/Dorset
RSPB Birds by Name – Lapwing
Lapwing photos at ebepe.com
Ageing and sexing (PDF; 5.7 MB) by Javier Blasco-Zumeta & Gerd-Michael Heinze

Lapwing Hatchlings video from Gallery of Living Nature

Vanellus
Articles containing video clips
Birds described in 1758
Birds of Europe
Migratory birds (Eastern Hemisphere)
National symbols of the Republic of Ireland
Taxa named by Carl Linnaeus